Claude Arthur Crocker (July 20, 1924 – December 19, 2002) was a Major League Baseball pitcher for the Brooklyn Dodgers in 1944 and 1945. The ,  right-hander was a native of Caroleen, North Carolina.

Crocker is one of many ballplayers who only appeared in the major leagues during World War II. He pitched a total of three games, all in relief, and his last one was his best. On September 30, 1945, the last day of the season, Crocker pitched two scoreless innings to earn a save in a 4–1 victory over the Philadelphia Phillies at Shibe Park. Totals for his brief career include 2 games finished, 4 earned runs allowed in 5 innings pitched, and an ERA of 6.75. He was perfect at the plate and on defense, going 1-for-1 (1.000) and recording 1 assist without making an error.

Crocker was also the head basketball coach at Presbyterian College for one year during the 1949–50 season. He coached the Blue Hose to a 14–15 record.

Crocker died at the age of 78 in Clinton, South Carolina.

References

External links 

Historic Baseball

Major League Baseball pitchers
Baseball players from North Carolina
Basketball coaches from North Carolina
Brooklyn Dodgers players
Presbyterian Blue Hose men's basketball coaches
Richmond Colts players
Burlington Bees (Carolina League) players
Asheville Tourists players
Mobile Bears players
1924 births
2002 deaths
People from Caroleen, North Carolina
People from Clinton, South Carolina